The women's singles competition of the table tennis events at the 2017 Southeast Asian Games is being held from 21 to 22 August at the MiTEC Hall 7 in Kuala Lumpur, Malaysia.

Format

Singles Events

(i) All Singles events shall be played in two stages; Stage 1 Group Single Round Robin and Stage 2 Elimination competition comprising Semi-finals and Finals.

(ii) In Stage 1, athletes shall be divided into four groups, Groups A, B, C and D. Athletes in each Group shall play each other in a single round robin competition within each Group. Each match shall be decided by a best-offive sets format. Each athlete shall be awarded the following points for each match:

 Two points for a win. 
 One point for a loss.

(iii) The winner in of each Group shall advance to the Stage 2 Semi-finals Elimination competition.

(iv) The winners of Group A and Group B shall be drawn for positions 1 and 4 respectively, whereas the winners of Group C and D shall be drawn for positions 2 or 3, taking into consideration separation of athletes from the same NOC. The matches shall be decided by best-of-seven games.

(v) The winners of the Elimination Semifinals competition shall qualify to play in the Finals for the gold medal.

(vi) There will be no playoff match for 3rd and 4th positions. Both losing SemiFinalists will receive a joint bronze medal each.

Schedule
All times are Malaysian Time (UTC+08:00).

Results

Preliminary round

Group W

Group X

Group Y

Group Z

Knockout round

Semifinals

Gold Medal Match

References

External links
 

Women's singles